The Puyuma language or Pinuyumayan, is the language of the Puyuma, an indigenous people of Taiwan. It is a divergent Formosan language of the Austronesian family. Most speakers are older adults.

Puyuma is one of the more divergent of the Austronesian languages and falls outside reconstructions of Proto-Austronesian.

Dialects
Nanwang Puyuma is considered to be the relatively phonologically conservative but grammatically innovative, as in it preserves proto-Puyuma voiced plosives but syncretizes the use of both oblique and genitive case.

Proto-Puyuma
Nanwang
(Main branch)
Pinaski–Ulivelivek
Rikavung
Kasavakan–Katipul

Puyuma-speaking villages are:

Puyuma cluster ('born of the bamboo')
 Puyuma
 Apapulu

Katipul cluster ('born of a stone')
 Alipai
 Pinaski; 2 km north of Puyuma/Nanwang, and maintains close relations with it
 Pankiu
 Kasavakan
 Katratripul
 Likavung
 Tamalakaw
 Ulivelivek

Phonology
Puyuma has 18 consonants and 4 vowels:

The official orthography is used in this article.

Grammar

Morphology
Puyuma verbs have four types of focus:
Actor focus: Ø (no mark), -em-, -en- (after labials), me-, meʔ-, ma-
Object focus: -aw
Referent focus: -ay
Instrumental focus: -anay

There are three verbal aspects:
Perfect
Imperfect
Future

There are two modes:
Imperative
Hortative future

Affixes include:
Perfect: Ø (no mark)
Imperfect: Reduplication; -a-
Future: Reduplication, sometimes only -a-
Hortative future: -a-
Imperative mode: Ø (no mark)

Syntax
Puyuma has a verb-initial word order.

Articles include:
i – singular personal
a – singular non-personal
na – plural (personal and non-personal)

Pronouns
The Puyuma personal pronouns are:

Affixes
The Puyuma affixes are:

Prefixes
ika-: the shape of; forming; shaping
ka-: stative marker
kara-: collective, to do something together
kare-: the number of times
ki-: to get something
kir-: to go against (voluntarily)
kitu-: to become
kur-: be exposed to; be together (passively)
m-, ma-: actor voice affix/intransitive affix
maka-: along; to face against
mara-: comparative/superlative marker
mar(e)-: reciprocal; plurality of relations
mi-: to have; to use
mu-: anticausative marker
mutu-: to become, to transform into
pa-/p-: causative marker
pu-: put
puka-: ordinal numeral marker
piya-: to face a certain direction
si-: to pretend to
tara-: to use (an instrument), to speak (a language)
tinu-: to simulate
tua-: to make, to form
u-: to go
ya-: to belong to; nominalizer

Suffixes
-a: perfective marker; numeral classifier
-an: nominalizer; collective/plural marker
-anay: conveyance voice affix/transitive affix
-aw: patient voice affix/transitive affix
-ay: locative voice affix/transitive affix
-i, -u: imperative transitive marker

Infixes
-in-: perfective marker
-em-: actor voice affix/intransitive affix

Circumfixes
-in-anan: the members of
ka- -an: a period of time
muri- -an: the way one is doing something; the way something was done
sa- -an: people doing things together
sa- -enan: people belonging to the same community
si- -an: nominalizer
Ca- -an, CVCV- -an: collectivity, plurality

Notes

References

External links
 Yuánzhùmínzú yǔyán xiànshàng cídiǎn 原住民族語言線上詞典  – Puyuma search page at the "Aboriginal language online dictionary" website of the Indigenous Languages Research and Development Foundation
 Puyuma teaching and leaning materials published by the Council of Indigenous Peoples of Taiwan 
 Puyuma translation of President Tsai Ing-wen's 2016 apology to indigenous people – published on the website of the presidential office

Formosan languages
Languages of Taiwan
Puyuma people